Adskaya Pochta (which may be translated as Infernal Post) was a Russian monthly magazine, established by  in Saint Petersburg in 1769.

Adskaya Pochta came out in the form of correspondence between two demons, who exposed the swindles of various government officials, landowners' inhumane treatment of their serfs, and vices of the clergy. The magazine's harsh polemics with the Vsyakaya vsyachina magazine (headed by Empress Catherine II) led to its closing. Only 6 issues of the magazine saw the light of day.

References

External link

1769 establishments in the Russian Empire
Defunct magazines published in Russia
Defunct political magazines
Magazines established in 1769
Magazines disestablished in 1769
Magazines published in Saint Petersburg
Monthly magazines published in Russia
Political magazines published in Russia
Russian-language magazines